is a Japanese Professional baseball pitcher for the Fukuoka SoftBank Hawks of Nippon Professional Baseball.

Early baseball career
In 2017, Okumura pitched in the 88th Intercity baseball tournament.

Professional career
On October 25, 2018, Okumura was drafted by the Fukuoka Softbank Hawks in the 2018 Nippon Professional Baseball draft.

On March 29, 2019, Okumura debuted in the Pacific League as a relief pitcher and recorded a Hold in the opening match of the 2019 season against the Saitama Seibu Lions. Since then, he has pitched in eight games, but on April 20, he hurt his right elbow and left the team for treatment. However, he returned to the team on August 17 and made a good pitching with no runs in two innings. In 2019 season, he recorded with a 12 Games pitched, a 0–0 Win–loss record, a 8.76 ERA, a 3 Holds, a 10 strikeouts in 12.1 innings.

In 2020 season, Okumura spent the first half of the season rehabilitating his right elbow, but returned on August 12 and scored one inning with no runs. And he recorded with a 5 Games pitched, a 2.08 ERA, a 7 strikeouts in 4.1 innings.

In 2021 season, he never had a chance to pitch in the Pacific League.

On August 29, 2022, he pitched his first start against the Orix Buffaloes and pitched five strong innings. He also pitched three scoreless innings against the Saitama Seibu Lions on September 13. However, the team announced that he injured his right elbow in a game against the Tohoku Rakuten Golden Eagles on September 16 and underwent surgery on September 30.

On November 13 2022, since he is expected to spend the 2023 season in rehabilitation, the Hawks re-signed him as a developmental player at his current estimated salary of 9 million yen. November 27, he will change his uniform number from 61 to 126 beginning with the 2023 season, it was announced.

References

External links

 Career statistics - NPB.jp
 61 Masato Okumura PLAYERS2022 - Fukuoka SoftBank Hawks Official site

1992 births
Living people
Fukuoka SoftBank Hawks players
Japanese baseball players
Nippon Professional Baseball pitchers
Baseball people from Ōita Prefecture
People from Nakatsu, Ōita